The 2005 Pacific Curling Championships were held at the Taipei Arena in Taipei, Republic of China (Taiwan) from December 2 to 7. 

Australia's Hugh Millikin won the men's event over Japan's Yoshiyuki Ohmiya. By virtue of reaching the finals, both nations qualified for the 2006 World Men's Curling Championship in Lowell, Massachusetts.

On the women's side, Japan's Yukako Tsuchiya defeated China's Wang Bingyu in the final. This qualified both Japan and China for the 2006 Ford World Women's Curling Championship in Grande Prairie, Alberta.

Men's

Final round-robin standings

Playoffs

Women's

Final round-robin standings

Playoffs

External links

Pacific Curling Championships, 2005
Pacific-Asia Curling Championships
Curling in Taiwan
International sports competitions hosted by Taiwan
2005 in Taiwanese sport